Mark L. Walker is a Democratic member of the Illinois House of Representatives for the 53rd district. The 53rd district, located in the Chicago metropolitan area, includes all or parts of Arlington Heights, Des Plaines, Mount Prospect, Rolling Meadows, and Prospect Heights.

He previously represented the 66th district in the Illinois House of Representatives for a single term from 2009 to 2011.

Biography
Walker served in the United States Army during the Vietnam War and during his service was awarded a Bronze Star. He later became a senior executive as Citigroup, including heading worldwide credit card operations. He then went into consulting at Walker Information; providing business expertise to various firms. He has also been a soccer coach and member of the Arlington Heights Park District Foundation board, and has co-chaired the Northwest Suburban Veterans Advisory Council. He has also worked with homeless organizations, and on community housing redevelopment. Mark Walker has a Bachelor of Arts and a master's degree in culture change from Brown University.

Electoral career
In 2008, Walker defeated Republican candidate and Elk Grove Village trustee Christine Prochno to succeed outgoing Representative Carolyn Krause. He served a single term during the 96th General Assembly. Walker was defeated in the 2010 general election by Republican David Harris who preceded Krause in the Illinois House. After Harris retired, Walker announced his intention to run for his seat. He defeated Republican nominee Eddie Corrigan and took office January 9, 2019.

Walker is also the Democratic Committeeman for Wheeling Township.

Illinois House of Representatives

Committees
As of 2022, Walker serves on six House committees and one subcommittee:
Financial Institutions committee (Chairperson)
International Trade & Commerce committee (Chairperson)
Economic Opportunity & Equity committee
Insurance committee
Revenue & Finance committee
Small Business, Tech Innovation, and Entrepreneurship committee
Sales, Amusement, & Other Taxes subcommittee

Legislation
While representing Illinois' 53rd House district, legislation introduced by Walker that went on to become law includes HB3865, which requires any company or individual advertising veterans' benefits appeal services to disclose in the advertisement that such services are available at no cost by county veterans service officers, among other provisions.

Electoral history

References

External links
Representative Mark L. Walker (D) 66th District official Illinois General Assembly site
Bills Committees
Mark Walker for Illinois State Representative official campaign website
 
Rep. Mark Walker at Illinois House Democrats

1941 births
Living people
People from Arlington Heights, Illinois
Military personnel from Illinois
Brown University alumni
Democratic Party members of the Illinois House of Representatives
21st-century American politicians